Kick Buttowski: Suburban Daredevil (simply known as Kick Buttowski) is an American animated television series created by Sandro Corsaro and produced by Disney Television Animation. The fourth Disney XD original series and the first such animated series, it is about a young boy named Clarence Francis "Kick" Buttowski who aspires to become the world's greatest daredevil with the help of his loyal friend, Gunther. Many of the characters and settings were based on Corsaro's childhood growing up in Stoneham, Massachusetts. The show uses Toon Boom Animation software, with some 3D-animated elements.

The show premiered on February 13, 2010, exactly one year after the launch of Disney XD, with two episodes airing the first day. There are two 11-minute segments per airing, with 54 episodes produced in total. The second season premiered on April 30, 2011. On December 2, 2012, Disney XD canceled the series after two seasons.

Episodes

Voice cast

Main cast
Charlie Schlatter as Kick
Matt Jones as Gunther
Danny Cooksey as Brad

Recurring cast
John DiMaggio as Mr. Vickle
Brian Stepanek as Dad
Kari Wahlgren as Mom
Eric Christian Olsen as Wade
Jeff Bennett as Billy Stumps
Greg Cipes as Horace
Harland Williams as Pantsy
Grey DeLisle as Brianna
Jessica DiCicco as Penelope
Suzanne Blakeslee as Librarian
Brian Doyle Murray as Clerk
Jess Harnell as Announcer
Mindy Sterling as Ms. Chicarelli
Clancy Brown as Gunther's Dad
April Winchell as Gunther's Mom
Maria Bamford as Jackie
Veronica Cartwright as Ms. Dominic
Emily Osment as Kendall
Carlos Alazraqui as Sanchez
Carl Faruolo as Papercut Peterson
Richard Steven Horvitz as Mouth
Kevin Michael Richardson as Rock Callahan
Danny Jacobs as Moog
Roz Ryan as Mrs. Fitzpatrick
James Arnold Taylor as Jock Wilder
Adam Carolla as One-Eyed Jackson
Simon Helberg as Ronaldo
Greg Cipes ash Emo Kid
Jeffrey Tambor as CEO
Tom Kenny as Kyle
Brian Vanholt as Boom McCondor
Jeff Bennett as Announcer
Alyssa Milano as Scarlett
Fred Tatasciore as Janitor
Tiffany Thornton as Teena Sometimes
Henry Winkler as Principal

Characters

Main
 Clarence Francis "Kick" Buttowski: a 10-year-old amateur, thrill-seeking often reckless daredevil. His main goal out of life is to embrace each day as if it were his own personal  "action movie". He embraces his stuntman persona to the point he has a very hard time ignoring opportunities to do stunts or care for his own wellbeing. He is skilled at stunt work despite his age but some of his stunts do backfire. He is rather short and wears a signature daredevil outfit; a white jumpsuit with red stripes down the sleeves, a white helmet with a red stripe, and yellow boots and gloves. Some of his more notable catchphrases are "It's show time," "Fail? I don't do fail," "Aw, biscuits,", "That's a rat", and "Chimi-changa". He is the middle child in his family. His middle name was announced in "Rank of Awesome", as a reference to his original name, Francis Little. He is picked on by his older brother, Brad Buttowski, who often refers to him as "dillweed". He has 3 arch-rivals: Kendall Perkins, Ronaldo, and Gordie Gibble.
 Gunther Magnuson: Kick's 10-year-old best friend and stunt coordinator who is chunky, worries a lot, and is easily distracted by shiny objects. It is also shown that Gunther can whistle very well. Gunther, unlike Kick, does not enjoy living on the edge and can drink a very large amount of Cheetah Chug without getting sick. He has Viking heritage and his family owns a restaurant which is very successful. His Viking Side Shows when Gunther gets serious or Angry which anyone (except Kick) can be intimidated. He wears blue shorts and a shirt with a red cap and orange sandals.
 Bradley "Brad" Buttowski: Kick's 17-year-old elder brother. He bullies and insults Kick, and is in charge when their parents are away. Brad also has very poor personal hygiene and thinks he is popular. His favorite phrase is "Dillweed", which he uses to refer to Kick and "Yeah, Brad" which is his catchphrase. He is a self proclaimed "ladies man" and will try to woo women which usually fails. He also has lackeys, who sometimes do his bidding or achieve his goals such as bullying Kick. He is good at manipulating people especially his parents to get out or get people in trouble but, it can also backfire at times.

Recurring
Brianna Buttowski: Kick's spoiled 7-year-old younger sister. She's mainly known for being a "pageant girl." Being the youngest, she usually gets her way by saying "I want..." When not participating in pageants, she likes to annoy her brother Kick, holding on to anything that's valuable to him, like his favorite cereal and tricycle. However, unlike their eldest brother Brad, she seems to have mutual respect for Kick and is very good at working together when on terms. She may have a disliking to Brad. Her favorite show is Teena Sometimes, which is why she is always dressed like her.
Honey Buttowski: Kick's mother. She's infrequently at home, as she and her husband take their daughter Brianna to compete in beauty pageants. She is very caring and protective of Kick but although she's often worried about him, she acknowledges his daredevil nature, sometimes even helping him with his stunts. In "Kickin' Genes" it is revealed that she was once a famous daredevil and speedboat racer called "Honey Splash". She gave up her life as a daredevil implementing she was pregnant. It is also shown that she was the one who gave Kick his trademark white jumpsuit as a present, to show him how much she supports him. Her homebaked cookies are very tasty to the point, it will drive anyone crazily obsessed to want more, even Kick and Herself.  
 Harold Buttowski: Kick's overcautious and neurotic father. He is usually cheery and easygoing but is also very anal about possible sources of danger. He also has an unhealthy love for his 1979 AMC Pacer Wagon, calling it "Monique" and his wife does the same by calling her car "Antonio". He is very obsessed of his wife's homemade cookies to the point he'll harm or bribe anyone who gets in his way. He seems to enjoy opening letters. He was (as shown in "Bad Table Manners") a master at ping pong when he was growing up.
Secret Spy Buttowski: Kick's grandfather. He was a spy who spied on a military general to beat and stop his evil plan in "Truth or Daredevil".
 Wade: A gas station worker that is friends with Kick. In "Stumped", Wade supplies Kick with Cheetah Chug, in hopes of finding a key. The key was a free ticket for Kick to see his favorite monster truck star, Billy Stumps. He is very calm and commonly clumsy, that he'll forget what he was previously doing.
 Billy Stumps: An extreme daredevil who is very famous, and one of Kick's idols. He is missing his left hand, and it is unknown why, presumably from one of his stunts. He appears as a cameo in a poster by Kick's door. He helped re-inspire Kick to do stunts when he lost his helmet (thanks to a call from Gunther in "Exposed!") with his standard "been there, done that" experience. He is always seen with his favorite hood ornament which is a golden horseshoe.
 Magnus and Helga Magnuson: Gunther's parents. They own a BMW Isetta and a restaurant called "BattleSnax". They are Vikings, lived in the Nordic country and have shown to have a deep friendship with the Buttowski Family.
 Bjørgen: Gunther's uncle. He works at BattleSnax and he often says words that rhyme with his name, also can speak regular English in later episodes. He is a Viking and lived in the Nordic country.
 Teena Sometimes: She is the star of her self-titled show, which was first mentioned in "Stumped!". She is a part-time spy and a part-time princess. She is also a singer. Her catchphrases are "I'll sparkle you until next week," and "Consider yourself sometimes!"
 Principal Henry: He is the principal of Mellowbrook Elementary School who loathes doing paperwork (it is unknown how much he hates paperwork) and isn't entirely bothered by Kick's antics as long as he graduates. This is made apparent in "Frame Story". He is voiced by legendary actor, Henry Winkler, who learned the principal's lines by remembering his time when he was in the principal's office during his childhood.
 Walter: He works at the Food N Fix when Wade is in promotion and works at a flower shop in Mellowbrook in "A Very Buttowski Mother's Day."
 Kendall Perkins: Kick's and Gunther's classmate, one of Kick's arch-rivals and as revealed in "Kick or Treat", one of Kick's next-door neighbors. She loves learning and she is the president of her class (former as of "Poll Position"). However, she is also apparently very bossy and high-strung and is shown to have very few friends. She and Kick both claim to hate each other, although at times they seem to show a romantic liking for each other. She has shown on separate occasions that she may, in fact, have a crush on Kick, such as being flattered by Kick's kiss in "Box Office Blitz", or seeking Kick out after he compliments her top during his depression when he loses his helmet in "Exposed". In "Power Play" she loosens a peg for a sandbag so when Ronaldo gets hit, Kick would have to play the part of Romeo in the play. Additionally, she refers to Kick as Clarence, his first name. She is now Kick’s girlfriend.
 Mr. Perkins: Kendall's father who is an actuary and makes his first speaking appearance in "Father From The Truth" and second in "Crumbs!", while the rest of his appearances are non-speaking cameos.
 Mr. Vickle: Kick's next-door neighbor. A heavyset middle-aged bachelor with an effeminate personality. He's one of the few adults that isn't ruffled by Kick's behavior, with the exception of his appearances in "Kick the Habit" and "Nerves of Steal".
 "Wacky" Jackie Wackerman: A funny and hyperactive new resident of Mellowbrook. She became obsessed with Kick in her debut appearance in "Obsession: For Kick", later stalking him due to her being his "number one fan", as well as being the president of his fan club.
 Glenn: A grocery store worker.  Whenever Kick shows up in the Mellowmart grocery store, he is sure Kick will wreck "his store", leading to trouble for Glenn.
 Pantsy: One of Brad's friends. He is also the assistant manager of the Mellowbrook Megaplex and has a very strict policy when it comes to patrons. He usually wears 3D glasses. His little brother is Mouth.
 Horace: Brad's other friend. He has green hair that covers his face, it is shown in "Kicked Out" that he's not all that smart.
 Mouth: Kick and Gunther's frenemy and their classmate whose real name is Christopher. He is the son of the 2nd assistant security guard at Mellowbrook Mall and is also Pantsy's younger brother. He schemes a lot and he loves playing shuffleboard. It is shown in "Detained" that he can get a hold of anything. He idolizes Rock Callahan along with Kick and Gunther (as shown in "Box Office Blitz").
 Coach Sternbeck: Kick's personal trainer in "Gym Dandy."
 Ms. Fitzpatrick: Kick's teacher that stays in his face. Her catchphrase is "Mmmm-Hmmm" which is also on her license plate. She often calls Kick Mr. Buttowski.
 Charlotte Chicarelli: She is one of Kick's next-door neighbors who always tattles on Kick and the other kids on the cul-de-sac for causing any kind of disruption.
 Oskar: Charlotte Chicarelli's dog that enjoys biting Kick's butt and chasing him. Kick and Oskar have a mutual hate for each other, although in "Dog Gone" they do show respect and a liking for each other, and a brothers-from-a-different-mother bond.
 Ronaldo: Kick and Gunther's class and another of Kick's arch-rivals whose first appearance is in "Mellowbrook Drift". A physics-obsessed bully who cheats in the Tri-County Cartacular by following the laws of physics. His jacket is somewhat similar to Kick's jumpsuit, only with opposite colors; maroon with yellow stripes down the sleeves and a small cape in the back. He hangs around a small posse of other nerds and goes to Kick's school.
 Cousin Kyle: Kick Buttowski's cousin who is a chatterbox and is also extremely dim-witted. In "Kyle Be Back," he gets in Kick's way from doing a record-breaking stunt. In "Kyle 2.0" it is shown he can create radio static just by being near it. However, it is shown that Kyle is also a huge fan of Kick.
 Papercut Peterson: A professional wrestler who helped Kick defeat Brad in "Drop Kick". He used to be Pile-Driver Peterson. He also won the Battle of the Bands by Auto-Tune. He appears in many episodes, although never displayed as a wrestler but as an unhygienic, lonely man. He also humorously often refers to Gunther as being a 'little girl'. He has a lookalike in the Old Country where Gunther and his family are from. His relation to this lookalike is unknown.
 Boom McCondor: One of the best stunt legends in the world. He had his first contest where Kick and Brad won in "Things That Make You Go Boom!" He usually has a catchphrase which is similar to a bird call.
 Emo Kid: a classmate of Kick and Gunther's in Mellowbrook Elementary School. He dresses in black and purple and his hair is partly dyed purple. He makes his first appearance in "Snowpocalypse". He is known to have a strong dislike for dodgeball. He doesn't speak much, but when he does, he has somewhat of an Eastern European or Mediterranean accent.
 Janitor Roberson: a janitor at Mellowbrook Elementary School.
 Gordie Gibble: Kick's archenemy whose real name is Gordon. A (former) BMX legend who broke records after Kick won the BMX Rodeo. After his loss, he went into kart racing and other sports. He is from West Mellowbrook. He has a rich father as made apparent in "Kart to Kart". He is voiced by Will Forte.
 The DiPazzi Twins: They first appeared on "Clothes Call", and again along with Gordon on "Switching Gears." Their names are Michael Anthony and Anthony Michael. They look very identical, but one has different eyes and the other has a different voice. They are both voiced by Sandro Corsaro: the show's creator.

Production

Creation

Corsaro has stated that he was thinking about his own childhood when he drew the character in 2002 and subsequently began developing the idea for a TV series. Kick was named Kid Knievel, and was slightly different from the original vision of himself. He was much smaller. He had blue stars on his helmet and blue stripes on his clothing in an apparent homage to Evel Knievel. Many of the show's humorous characters and locations were inspired by Corsaro's hometown of Stoneham, Massachusetts.

Development

Kick Buttowski: Suburban Daredevil started production on December 19, 2008. The original name was Kid Knievel at the time. The title was changed to Kick Buttowski on April 4, 2009. In early December 2009, it was announced that the series would premiere on February 13, 2010, exactly one year after the launch of Disney XD, and the premiere of its first original series, Aaron Stone. The series's stunt coordinator is Robbie Knievel, the son of Evel Knievel.

Series pilot
The pilot was written and developed by Devin Bunje and Nick Stanton, who eventually left the project to work on another Disney XD series, Zeke and Luther. The pilot was later split into the first two episodes of the series, "Dead Man's Drop" and "Stumped".

Broadcast

Kick Buttowski: Suburban Daredevil had been set to air in November 2009, but Disney announced it would instead air in February 2010. The show debuted on Disney XD on February 13, 2010 at 8:30 a.m. ET. Sneak peeks and promos were shown on Disney XD, DisneyXD.com and Disney Channel. The series sometime aired Saturday mornings at 8:30 a.m. on Disney XD. 

On April 2, 2010, the series first aired on Disney Channel as a special presentation with the episode, "Obsession: For Kick / Flush and Release" as part of the "Get Animated" marathon. Another presentation was shown on Disney Channel on May 22, 2010, featuring three episodes. 
On June 18, 2011, Kick Buttowski was moved to an off and on spot on Disney Channel with its incorporation into Toonin' Saturdays, Disney Channel's new Saturday morning cartoon 
block, the show last aired on Disney Channel on December 25, 2011.

The show aired its final episodes on December 2, 2012, After the show's cancellation reruns still air on Disney XD from time to time.

Reception
The pilot episode "Dead Man's Drop/Stumped" was watched by 842,000 viewers, the second highest-rated series premiere in Disney XD's history. The second episode, "If Books Could Kill/There Will Be Nachos" was watched by 972,000 viewers.

See also
Wild Grinders
Rocket Power

References

External links

Kick Buttowski – Suburban Daredevil at the Big Cartoon DataBase

2010 American television series debuts
2012 American television series endings
2010s American animated television series
2010s American children's comedy television series
American children's animated action television series
American children's animated adventure television series
American children's animated comedy television series
Animated television series about children
Disney XD original programming
Elementary school television series
English-language television shows
Television series by Disney Television Animation